Michael Amiras (born 22 November 1999) is a South African rugby union player for the  in the Currie Cup. His regular position is flanker.

Amiras was named in the  side for the 2022 Currie Cup Premier Division.

References

South African rugby union players
Living people
Rugby union locks
Rugby union flankers
Griquas (rugby union) players
Slava Moscow players
1999 births